Kevin Murphy may refer to:

Artists and actors 
 Kevin Murphy (actor) (born 1956), American actor, author and puppeteer, best known for his work on Mystery Science Theater 3000
 Kevin Murphy (musician) (born 1947), American keyboardist
 Kevin Murphy (screenwriter), American screenwriter, television producer, and composer
 Kevin Andrew Murphy, American novelist and game writer
 Kevin Mark Murphy (born 1957), Canadian musician, criminal lawyer, co-founder of Singing Fools

Politicians 
 Kevin Murphy (ombudsman) (1937–2012), appointed Ombudsman by the President of Ireland, serving from 1994 to 2003
 Kevin J. Murphy (politician) (born 1952), Massachusetts House of Representatives
 Kevin P. Murphy (born 1965), Pennsylvania politician, representing the 113th PA House District
 Kevin Murphy (Canadian politician) (born 1970), Canadian politician, Speaker of the Nova Scotia House of Assembly

Sports figures 
 Kevin Murphy (linebacker) (born 1963), retired American football player
 Kevin Murphy (lineman) (born 1965), American football player
 Kevin Murphy (basketball) (born 1990), professional basketball player
 Kevin Murphy (cricketer) (born 1963), Zimbabwean cricketer
 Kevin Murphy (swimmer) (born 1949), "King of the Channel" title holder for crossing the English Channel

Other 
 Kevin J. Murphy (professor) (born 1957), Kenneth L. Trefftzs Chair in Finance, USC Marshall School of Business
 Kevin M. Murphy (born 1958), economist and professor at the University of Chicago
 Kevin Murphy (hairdresser), Australian-born hairdresser